Nanda Nanditha may refer to:

 Nanda Nanditha (2008 film) - Kannada language film
 Nanda Nanditha (2012 film) - a remake of the 2008 film, in Tamil and Telugu languages